Coalition for Christian Outreach (CCO) is a nonprofit campus ministry headquartered in Pittsburgh, Pennsylvania. CCO was officially incorporated on March 23, 1971. As of September 2012, the CCO employs 225 staff members on 104 campuses and universities, primarily in Pennsylvania, Ohio, and West Virginia. Activities at the campuses can include Bible study, working for humanitarian causes such as Habitat for Humanity, etc.  For nine consecutive years, the CCO has been named a Best Christian Workplace in the US by the Best Christian Workplace Institute.

Locations 
CCO has ministries at the following colleges and universities:

 Allegheny College 
 American University 
 Arcadia University
 Art Institute of Pittsburgh
 Binghamton University 
 Bloomsburg University of Pennsylvania
 Bluffton University 
 Brookdale Community College
 Broome Community College
 Butler County Community College
 Butler University
 Cabrini College
 California University of Pennsylvania
 Capital University
 Carnegie Mellon University
 Cedar Crest College
 Centenary College
 Chatham University
 Clarion University of Pennsylvania
 College of Staten Island
 Columbus College of Art & Design
 Columbus State Community College, Columbus Campus
 Community College of Allegheny County, Allegheny Campus
 Community College of Beaver County
 Cumberland County, New Jersey Schools
 Denison University
 Drexel University
 Duquesne University
 Eastern University
 Edinboro University of Pennsylvania
 Elizabethtown College
 Elmira College
 Franklin & Marshall College
 Gannon University
 Geneva College
 Georgetown University
 Gordon College
 Grove City College
 Haverford College
 Houghton College
 Howard University
 Indiana University of Pennsylvania
 Indiana University-Purdue University Fort Wayne
 Juniata College
 Kent State University
 Kent State University at Stark
 Kenyon College
 Kutztown University of Pennsylvania
 La Roche College
 Lehigh Carbon Community College
 Lycoming College
 Malone University
 Marion Technical College
 Messiah College
 Montgomery County Community College
 Montgomery County Community College, West Campus
 Nyack College in Washington, DC
 Ohio Dominican University
 Ohio State University
 Ohio State University at Marion
 Ohio Wesleyan University
 Otterbein University
 Owens Community College
 Penn State Altoona
 Penn State Beaver
 Penn State Fayette, The Eberly Campus
 Penn State Lehigh Valley
 Penn State New Kensington
 Penn State University Park
 Pennsylvania College of Technology
 Philadelphia University
 Pittsburgh Technical Institute
 Point Park University
 Prince George's Community College
 Princeton University
 Robert Morris University
 Shippensburg University of Pennsylvania
 Sinclair Community College
 Slippery Rock University of Pennsylvania
 Stark State College
 Temple University
 Thiel College
 University of Akron
 University of Cincinnati
 University of Dayton
 University of Findlay
 University of Pennsylvania
 University of Pittsburgh
 University of Pittsburgh School of Law
 University of Pittsburgh at Bradford
 University of Pittsburgh at Titusville
 University of the Sciences in Philadelphia
 Villanova University
 Washington and Jefferson College
 Waynesburg University
 West Virginia University
 West Virginia Wesleyan College
 Westminster College
 Williamson Free School of Mechanical Trades
 Wright State University
 York College of Pennsylvania
 Youngstown State University

History 
The CCO’s first official church partnership was created in 1971 with Graystone Presbyterian Church to reach students at Indiana University of Pennsylvania. In 1973, the CCO placed staff members as residence hall directors at both Waynesburg College (now University) and Robert Morris College (now University).

Jubilee conference 
CCO hosts its annual Jubilee conference every February in Pittsburgh, Pennsylvania, described as "one of the biggest assemblies of Christian youth.". It normally draws 2000 or more students and features a wide variety of religious and social topics. Notable speakers have included Chuck Colson, Michael Gerson, and others.

References 

Christian youth organizations
Student religious organizations in the United States
Christian organizations established in 1971
Youth organizations based in the United States